Retamosa de Cabañas, better known just as Retamosa, is a village belonging to the Cabañas del Castillo municipality, located in the province of Cáceres, in the autonomous community of Extremadura, Spain. According to the 2010 census (INE), the village had a population of 48 inhabitants.

References 

Populated places in the Province of Cáceres